Charles-François Lebœuf, called Nanteuil (9 August 1792 – 1 November 1865) was a French sculptor.

Career
Born in Paris, he studied with Pierre Cartellier at the École des Beaux-Arts, winning the Grand Prix de Rome in Sculpture in 1817 with a gypsum figure of Agis, Dying by His Own Arms. The prize included a period of study at the Villa Medici of the French Academy in Rome, where Nanteuil carved the marble statue Dying Eurydice (1822), which he exhibited in Paris in his highly successful debut at the Salon of 1824. The statue is now in the Musée du Louvre. This work later inspired Auguste Clésinger's Woman Bitten by a Snake (1847, Musée d'Orsay).

Nanteuil received many commissions from the French government, including one for a group entitled Commerce and Industry at the French Senate in the Palais du Luxembourg, which was inspired by the first-century sculpture Castor and Pollux. Other commissioned works include a seated statue of Montesquieu (1840, Louis Philippe I's Museum of French History at the Palace of Versailles) and  the bronze commemorative statue of General Desaix (1844, located at the Place de Jaude in  ). His work was also incorporated into the decorations at the Gare du Nord, the Palais Garnier, and the Palais du Louvre (when it was rebuilt during the Second Empire).

Nanteuil's most important ecclesiastical works are two pediment sculpture groups in stone, Hommage to the Virgin (1830, Church of Notre Dame de Lorette, Paris) and the Glorification of Saint Vincent de Paul (1846, Church of Saint-Vincent-de-Paul, Paris), which reveal the influence of Italian sculpture of the early Renaissance and of sculptures from Aegina and the Parthenon.

Nanteuil died in Paris.

List of works

 Agis, Dying on His Own Arms (1817), statue, plaster, Paris, École Nationale Supérieure des Beaux-Arts
 Dying Eurydice (1822), statue, marble, Paris, Musée du Louvre
 Portrait of the painter Pierre-Paul Prud'hon (1827), bust, marble, Versailles, Châteaux de Versailles et de Trianon : Salon of 1827, number 1163
 Portrait of the painter Pierre-Paul Prud'hon (1828), bust, marble, Paris, Musée du Louvre
 Pediment sculpture of the Church Notre-Dame-de-Lorette, Paris (1830)
 Alexander fighting (1836), statue, stone, Paris, Jardin des Tuileries, grand bassin rond, le grand carré
 3 bas-reliefs for the peristyle of the Panthéon de Paris (1837) : The Apotheosis of the heroes who have died for the fatherland, framed by The Sciences and the  Arts and The Magistracy.
 Portrait of Charles the Bold, duc de Bourgogne (1433 - 1477) (1838), bust, plaster, Versailles, Châteaux de Versailles et de Trianon
 Portrait of Charlemagne, empereur d'Occident (742 - 814) (1840), larger-than-life size standing statue, marble, Versailles, Châteaux de Versailles et de Trianon
 Portrait of Mathieu Molé, chancellor of France (1584 - 1656) (1840), larger-than-life size standing statue, plaster, Versailles, Châteaux de Versailles et de Trianon
 Charles de Secondat, baron de Montesquieu, man of letters (1689 - 1755) (1840), statue, plaster, Versailles, Châteaux de Versailles et de Trianon
 Death of Orestes (1840), drawing, brown lead, Paris, Musée du Louvre, Département des Arts graphiques
 Portrait of Henri LXI, prince de Reuss-Chlietz, Général de Brigade in the service of France (1784 - 1813) (1841), bust, plaster,  Versailles, Châteaux de Versailles et de Trianon
 General Desaix (1848), bronze, Clermont-Ferrand, Place de Jaude
 Glorification of Saint Vincent de Paul, Paris, Church of Saint-Vincent-de-Paul, circa 1850
 Portrait of Jean-Luc-Sébastien-Bonaventure Carbuccia, Général de Brigade (1808 - 1854) (1858), bust, marble, Versailles, Châteaux de Versailles et de Trianon
 Dying Eurydice (1862), statue (replica), bronze, 2nd arrondissement of Paris, Galerie Vivienne
 The town of Beauvais and the town of Lille (1865), stone statues on the facade of the Gare du Nord, Paris
 King Charles X, colossal statue, stone, Versailles, Châteaux de Versailles et de Trianon
 Portrait of Louis-Philippe I, king of the French (1773 - 1830), bust, plaster, Versailles, Châteaux de Versailles et de Trianon
 Portrait of Étienne Jacques Joseph Alexandre Macdonald, Duke of Tarente, Maréchal de l'Empire (1765 - 1840), larger-than-life size standing statue, marble, Versailles, Châteaux de Versailles et de Trianon

References
Notes

Sources
 Ehrard, Antoinette (2001). "Autour de la statue de Desaix par Nanteuil" in Annales historiques de la Révolution française . issue 324 "Numéro spécial Louis Charles Antoine Desaix. Officier du roi, Général de la République" (April–June 2001) .
 Hoog, Simone (1993). Musée national de Versailles. Les sculptures. I - Le musée, (preface by Jean-Pierre Babelon, with the collaboration of Roland Brossard) . Réunion des musées nationaux, Paris.
 Lemaistre, Isabelle (1998). "Nanteuil [Leboeuf], Charles-François" in Turner 1998, vol. 22, p. 465.
 Turner, Jane, editor (1998). The Dictionary of Art, reprinted with minor corrections, 34 volumes. New York: Grove. .

Other sources
 Lami, Stanislas (1914–1921). Dictionnaire des sculpteurs de l'École française au XIXe siècle (4 volumes). Paris: H. Champion. Listings at WorldCat. Nendein, Liechtenstein: Kraus (1970 reprint). Listings at WorldCat.

External links
 

1792 births
1865 deaths
French architectural sculptors
19th-century French sculptors
French male sculptors
Prix de Rome for sculpture
19th-century French male artists